A radiobinding assay is a method of detecting and quantifying antibodies targeted toward a specific antigen. As such, it can be seen as the inverse of radioimmunoassay, which quantifies an antigen by use of corresponding antibodies.


Technique
The corresponding antigen is radiolabeled and mixed with the fluid that may contain the antibody, such as blood serum from a person. Presence of antibodies causes precipitation of antibody-antigen complexes that can be collected by centrifugation into pellets. The amount of antibody is proportional to the radioactivity of the pellet, as determined by gamma counting.

Uses
It is used to detect most autoantibodies seen in latent autoimmune diabetes.

References

Immunologic tests